Denis Brière (1945/1946 – July 8, 2022) was a Canadian forestry professor and academic administrator. He took office as Université Laval's 25th rector (president) on June 1, 2007. He ran unsuccessfully for the position in 2002. He was formerly  dean of the faculty of forestry and geomatics at Université Laval in Quebec City, and held that office since 2000. He has also worked as an executive with James Bay Energy Corporation (Société d'énergie de la Baie-James), a consortium which built a series of hydro-electric dams near James Bay, Kruger Inc., a Canadian pulp and paper company, and Groupe Comact, a manufacturer of wood processing equipment.

Awards 
In 1994, he was named forestry engineer of the year by the Ordre des ingénieurs forestiers du Québec, the professional body for foresters in Quebec.

References

External links
Université Laval – Monsieur Denis Brière – 25e recteur de l'Université Laval 
Personal page at faculty of forestry and geomatics
Research office page on Brière
26 septembre 2002 Plan d'action du candidat au rectorat Denis Brière
Canada Newswire, April 30, 2007 – Denis Brière élu recteur de l'Université Laval
Canada Newswire, June 11, 2010 – Denis Brière elected Chair of the Board of CREPUQ

1940s births
2022 deaths
French Quebecers
Forestry academics
Year of birth missing
University of British Columbia alumni
Rectors of Université Laval
Canadian foresters
Université Laval alumni
Academic staff of Université Laval